Unió Esportiva Recreativa Pineda de Mar (in Spanish, Unión Deportiva Recreativa Pineda de Mar) is a basketball club based in Pineda de Mar, Catalonia, Spain.

History
The club was created in 1952 as a merge of three entities in the municipality (Club Ciclista, Club de Bàsquet and Club d'Escacs), but it was not officially founded until 1954.

UER Pineda de Mar played in Primera División from 1971 to 1979, when it was relegated to the Primera B. In these golden years, the club achieved the fourth position in the 1976–77 and played two times the Korać Cup.

In 1995, the club came back to the second division, this time called Liga EBA and in 1996 joins the new second division LEB, where it played only two seasons before resigning. Nowadays, it plays in the Regional leagues of Catalonia.

Season by season

Notable players
 Nino Buscató

References

External links
Official website

Catalan basketball teams
Former LEB Oro teams
Former Liga EBA teams